Bernard Dumont (born 30 November 1946) is a French fencer. He competed in the team sabre events at the 1972 and 1976 Summer Olympics.

References

External links
 

1946 births
Living people
French male sabre fencers
Olympic fencers of France
Fencers at the 1972 Summer Olympics
Fencers at the 1976 Summer Olympics